This is a list of media in Charlottetown, Prince Edward Island, Canada.

Radio

Television

Newspapers and magazines
 The Guardian - daily
 The Northern Star (Queens County community newspaper)
 The Buzz (province-wide independent arts/entertainment) 
 The Cadre (UPEI student paper)
 The Surveyor (Holland College student paper)
 The Eastern Graphic (Kings County weekly newspaper)
PEI Living Magazine (province-wide independent glossy lifestyle magazine)

References

Charlottetown
 
Media, Charlottetown